Leucanopsis affinella is a moth of the family Erebidae. It was described by Embrik Strand in 1919. It is found in Peru.

References

affinella
Moths described in 1919